I Putu Gede Suwi Santoso (born in Denpasar, 1 December 1973) is a former Indonesian footballer. He normally plays as a defensive midfielder. His name Suwi is derived from the first syllable of his father's and mother's name.

In 2007, Putu Gede moved to Persita Tangerang from Arema Malang, following Benny Dollo, Arema's coach who helped winning Piala Indonesia twice. In Arema, Putu become ever a captain and helped this club winning Piala Indonesia twice (2005 and 2006). Like Ansyari Lubis, he has much experience, high flying hours and spirit leadership. With his position Putu look very easy contents of field when his team attack although get pressure from enemy's team.

As a captain he is not typical, he often provocated from the opponent or enemy in the field. However, he still have an own-plus, he can firing spirits his club teammates for winning a match.

After retiring from playing in 2012, Putu Gede was appointed assistant head coach of his last club Persipro Probolinggo in 2013. He was appointed head coach of PSBK Blitar in 2014. in 2017, I Putu Gede take charge of Persibo Bojonegoro as a head coach.

Putu Gede is a former Indonesia national football team player.

Honours

Club
Arema Malang
 First Division: 2004
 Copa Indonesia: 2005, 2006

International
 AFF Championship
 Runners-up (2) : 2000, 2002

References

External links

Indonesian footballers
Indonesia international footballers
1973 births
Living people
Badak Lampung F.C.
Badak Lampung F.C. managers
Deltras F.C. players
Arema F.C. players
Persebaya Surabaya players
Persita Tangerang players
Persekabpas Pasuruan players
Persipro Probolinggo players
Liga 1 (Indonesia) players
Liga 2 (Indonesia) players
Indonesian Hindus
Balinese people
People from Denpasar
Sportspeople from Bali
Association football midfielders